First Baptist Church of Vermillion is a historic church in Vermillion, South Dakota.  It was added to the National Register in 1982.

It was deemed significant for the architecture of its original wing, designed by Wallace LeRoy Dow and built during 1889–90.  The second wing, designed by Beuttler and Arnold of Sioux City, Iowa, was designed to match, in 1924.

References

Baptist churches in South Dakota
Churches on the National Register of Historic Places in South Dakota
Romanesque Revival church buildings in South Dakota
Churches completed in 1925
Churches in Clay County, South Dakota
National Register of Historic Places in Clay County, South Dakota
Buildings and structures in Vermillion, South Dakota